Pasewalk (GS05) was a Kondor I-class minesweeper built in East Germany. After the Volksmarine was disbanded just before the reunification of Germany, she was sold to Malta in 1992 and renamed P31 and was used as a patrol boat. After being decommissioned, she was scuttled as a dive site in 2009 off Comino.

History

East Germany
The minesweeper was laid down on 12 December 1968 at Peenewerft shipyard in Wolgast. She was launched on 18 June 1969 and commissioned on 18 October of that same year. She was the eighth ship to be built within the Kondor I class, and was named Pasewalk after the town of the same name in Mecklenburg-West Pomerania federated state in northern Germany. She was used to patrol the river banks between East and West Germany, as well as a minesweeper.

After the Volksmarine was disbanded, she and the other Kondor I-class vessels were deemed too obsolete to join the German Navy, so she was decommissioned in 1990. Her armaments were removed.

Malta
The unarmed minesweeper was then purchased by Malta on 1 July 1992 along with her sister ship Ueckermünde, and they were given the pennant numbers P30 and P31. P31 became a patrol boat within the Offshore Command of the Maritime Squadron of the Armed Forces of Malta. A third sister ship, Boltenhagen, was purchased in 1997 and was given the pennant number . Since the former minesweepers were purchased unarmed, some light armament was then added by the AFM.

P31 was then used to secure the Maltese coast against smuggling and border control operations. Most notably was the rescue of 251 illegal immigrants from their  boat which was sinking  to the south of Malta in over force 6 winds.

P31 was decommissioned in 2004 and bought by the Malta Tourism Authority. The wreck now lies on bare sand, and it is located close but not on the important sea grass beds.

See also

References

Ships sunk as dive sites
Ships built in East Germany
1969 ships
Naval ships of Malta
Ships of the Volksmarine
Cold War minesweepers of Germany
Shipwrecks of Malta
Maritime incidents in 2009
Underwater diving sites in Malta
Comino
Patrol boats